Until Nothing Remains is a German television film depicting a story about Scientology and its effects upon converts. In the film, a young couple are brought into Scientology by means of manipulation. "Eventually, the husband decides to leave the group, losing not only his wife in the process, but also his young child and a big portion of his family's inheritance, which his wife has donated to the church." The film is reportedly based on the real-life experiences of a German man named Heiner von Rönn.

It was reported that the Church of Scientology opposed the release of the film, which aired Wednesday, March 31, 2010, on the German ARD public-television network.

According to German news magazine Der Spiegel, the broadcast was watched by "8.69 million viewers (market share of 27.1 percent)". Wednesday film ratings are "usually between four and six million viewers."

Scientology produced a 40-minute interview film in response, which was screened the following day, and made available on the Internet.

References

External links
 
 Until Nothing Remains on XENU TV
 The Soul Catchers (German: Die Seelenfänger), a documentary broadcast in connection with the movie, that details the story of Heiner von Rönn and others.

2010 television films
2010 films
2010 drama films
German drama films
2010s German-language films
German-language television shows
German television films
Scientology in popular culture
Works critical of Scientology
2010s German films
Das Erste original programming